Jack Wells (born 21 September 1997) is a professional rugby league footballer who plays as a  forward for Barrow Raiders in the RFL Championship.

He played for the Wigan Warriors in the Super League, and spent time on loan from Wigan at both the Swinton Lions and the Toronto Wolfpack in the Betfred Championship.

Background
Wells was born in Salford, Greater Manchester, England.

Playing career

Wigan Warriors
He has spent time on loan from Wigan at both the Swinton Lions and Toronto Wolfpack in the Betfred Championship.

Salford Red Devils
On 16 December 2020 it was announced that Wells would be joining the Salford Red Devils for the 2021 season; his hometown club and the club he supported as a boy.

References

External links
Wigan Warriors profile
SL profile

1997 births
Living people
Barrow Raiders players
English rugby league players
Rugby league players from Salford
Rugby league second-rows
Salford Red Devils players
Swinton Lions players
Toronto Wolfpack players
Wigan Warriors players